Yasmeen Hameed is a Pakistani Urdu poet, translator and an educator.

Career
Yasmeen Hameed has more than thirty years of experience in the fields of education, literature and art. She was the Founding Director of Gurmani Centre for South Asian Languages and Literature in the Social Sciences Department at the Lahore University of Management Sciences (LUMS) where she worked from 2007 to August 2016.

She has interviewed a number of renowned Pakistani literary personalities on Pakistani television and has participated widely in poetry symposia at national and international levels.

She has written scripts in English for cultural/fashion shows sponsored by the Government of Pakistan, performed in London in 1995 and Washington in 1996 and in the World cup cricket Cultural Festival in Pakistan in 1996. She has also contributed a monthly column to the "Books & Authors" supplement of The Daily Dawn newspaper.

Education 
M. Sc. :Nutrition
Punjab University – Lahore (1972)
B. Sc.: Home Economics- Home Economics College
Punjab University – Lahore (1970)

Original works 
Yasmeen Hameed has published five books of poetry in Urdu:

Awards for poetry and literature 
Pakistani Urdu Verse, UBL/Jang Literary Excellence Award (2012)
Tamgha-e-Imtiaz (Medal of Distinction) for Literature awarded by the Government of Pakistan in 2008
Fatima Jinnah Medal for Literature awarded by the Government of Punjab, Pakistan on International Women’s Day, 8 March 2006
Ahmed Nadeem Qasmi Award for Poetry (2001) for the collection, Fana bhi eik saraab
Hijra Award for Hijra year 1417 (June 1996 – May 1997)
 Allama Iqbal Award  for the collection, Aadha Din aur Aadhi Raat.
Roll of Honour and Gold Medal from Punjab University, Lahore (1972)

Works to be published 
Contemporary Verse from Pakistan (English)
Fifth collection of poetry (Urdu) titled Bay- samar pairhon ki khwahish.

References

External links
COLUMN:THE POETRY OF YASMEEN HAMEED on Dawn (newspaper)

1951 births
Living people
Poets from Lahore
Pakistani poets
Pakistani humanitarians
Writers from Lahore
Pakistani women writers
University of the Punjab alumni
Academic staff of Lahore University of Management Sciences
Women writers from Punjab, Pakistan
Pakistani educators
Pakistani translators
Recipients of Tamgha-e-Imtiaz